South Korean Vietnamese or Vietnamese South Korean may refer to:
Vietnamese people in South Korea
South Koreans in Vietnam
South Korea–Vietnam relations
Multiracial people of South Korean and Vietnamese descent